The 17th People's Choice Awards, honoring the best in popular culture for 1990, were held on March 11, 1991, at Universal Studios Hollywood, in Universal City, California. They were hosted by Burt Reynolds, and broadcast on CBS.

Awards
Winners are listed first, in bold.

References

External links
 1991 People's Choice.com

People's Choice Awards
1991 awards in the United States
1991 in California
March 1991 events in the United States